New York Mennonite Conference is a regional conference of Mennonite Church USA comprising 14 churches Upstate New York.  

Officially founded in 1973 as the NYS Mennonite Fellowship, its primary goal was to facilitate fellowship amongst congregations, while leaving most conference functions to the conferences from which members originated.  By 1987, the Fellowship had taken on the functions of a conference, primarily ordination and nurture of pastoral leaders.  In the early 1990s, the Fellowship took on the name, New York Mennonite Conference.

Member congregations

Central District
Rochester Mennonite Fellowship
Sojourners Mennonite Fellowship

Northern District

Bethel Christian Church
First Mennonite Church of New Bremen
Lowville Mennonite Church
Pine Grove Mennonite Church
Watertown Mennonite Church

Southern District

Chenunda Creek Fellowship
Community Mennonite Fellowship of Corning
Jesus Church
Yorks Corners Mennonite Church

Western District

Buffalo Chin Emmanuel Church
Clarence Center-Akron Mennonite Church

References
New York Mennonite Conference, www.nymennonite.org

Mennonite denominations
Mennonitism in the United States
Mennonite Church USA